The Portsdown and Horndean Light Railway  was a tram service that ran initially from Cosham to Horndean in Hampshire, England.

History
Authorised in 1899 by an Order of the 1896 Light Railway Commission under the Light Railway Act, it opened on 3 March 1903 and started from a junction with the Portsmouth Corporation Transport street tramway system on the Portsmouth Road, south of Cosham Station. The company was a wholly owned subsidiary of The Provincial Tramways Company. The system transformed the growth of the Waterlooville, Cowplain and Horndean areas. Guidebooks were produced advertising the benefits of healthy country air and fresh farm food.

A steam tramcar, designed by John Grantham, was used experimentally. This was probably a short-term expedient, pending electrification.

Route
The route ran alongside the London Road (now A3) throughout and traces can still be seen as extra-wide pavements in several locations, and the abutments of the old bridge over the Southwick Road in Cosham.
From 1924 through running onto Portsmouth Corporation tramlines was introduced with the light railway trams running firstly to the town hall and later to Clarence Pier and finally to South Parade Pier.

Replacement by buses

The last tram ran on 9 January 1935, by which time it had been superseded by motor buses, and became the Southdown Bus Company Route 42. The company broke up in 1987 as a result of privatisation, and the route fell into the hands of Transit Holdings which had owned Southdown Portsmouth operations. The company was subsequently bought by FirstGroup in 1995. 

In 2006, new lighting was installed along the route as part of Havant Borough Council's bus corridor improvement scheme. The star was then introduced by First Hampshire and Dorset in 2008 as a result of the creation of the A3 corridor.

References

External links
 Local historian
 Original photo 
 Preserved trams
 Regeneration of route
 Portsdown and Horndean Light Railway at the British Tramway Company Badges and Buttons website.

Railway lines opened in 1903
Railway lines closed in 1935
Tram transport in Hampshire
4 ft 7¾ in gauge railways in England